Eois dissimilis is a moth in the family Geometridae. It is found in the Indian Subregion and Sri Lanka.

Description
Wingspan is about 20mm. Antennae of male ciliated. Hind wings with veins 3 and 4 stalked. Similar to Polynesia sunandava, differ in there being hardly any traces of silver except on the subcostal fascia of fore wing. The rufous spots replaced by ill-defined antemedial, postmedial and submarginal lines and a few scattered specks.

References

Moths described in 1887
Eois
Moths of Asia